Right Now is the debut, and so far only, studio album by Scottish singer Leon Jackson, released on 20 October 2008, via Syco Music and Sony BMG. It was produced by Steve Mac. Jackson described the album as "a mixture in styles of modern jazz with singer-songwriter elements, and a lot of it is really soulful." Right Now received mixed reviews although the single, "Don't Call This Love", which was released as the album's second single in October 2008, entered the UK Singles Chart at number three and the Scottish Singles Charts at number one, where it remained on the top position for two weeks.

Right Now was a commercial success for Jackson, debuting within the top five in both the United Kingdom and Scotland. Right Now spent ten weeks within the UK Top 100 Album Charts, and twelve weeks within the Scottish 100 Album Charts. To date, the album has sold 135,892 copies in the UK, becoming Gold certified by the BPI.

Background and release

The first single, "Don't Call This Love", was released on 12 October 2008. Jackson made a guest appearance on the fifth series of The X Factor the night before, to perform the single. "Don't Call This Love" peaked at No. 3 in the United Kingdom and No. 8 in Ireland.

Right Now was released 21 October 2008. It debuted at number 7 on the Ireland Top 75 in the week of 23 October 2008, remaining on that chart for a total of five weeks. It debuted at No. 4 on the UK Top 40 Albums chart for the week of 26 October 2008. During the following week, it was at No. 20, and the week after that No. 37. During the following week, it slipped out of the Top 40 but remained in the UK Top 75 chart for six additional weeks.

The next two singles, "Creative" and "Stargazing", were released as download-only. "Creative", which was released in November 2008, peaked at No. 94 on the charts for the week of 29 November 2008. "Stargazing" was released in January 2009 but failed to make an impact on the charts. The album sold 135,892 copies. On 19 March 2009 it was confirmed that Leon Jackson was dropped by his label, Syco/Sony, after poor sales of his album and the lack of success of his most recent singles.

The album was recorded from 2007–2008 under the direction of Simon Cowell, head of the Syco/Sony BMG record label, and under the production of producer Steve Mac. In an episode of the Bebo series from Jackson Leon's Life, one episode shows Jackson recording the track "All in Good Time" and how the original high note towards the end of the song was changed to a lower key note because Jackson could not reach the high note well enough on the original version of the song. The album was completed in 2008 and released on 20 October 2008. The single was available to download from midnight after the result of the show on 15 December 2007, and a CD was released on 19 December 2007. This is unusual as most new singles are released on a Monday to gain maximum sales for the UK Singles Chart the following Sunday. Exceptions included the previous two X Factor winners whose singles released in this fashion, in order for them to compete to be the Christmas number-one single, which they all became. A video for the single was made by each of the final four of the series, Jackson, Rhydian Roberts, Same Difference, and Niki Evans. However, only the winner's version of the song and video was released.

The song was the fourth biggest-selling single in the UK in 2007 and remained number one in 2008. However, this version of the song remained in the top 40 for seven weeks, despite being at the top of the chart for three weeks. It soon disappeared from the top 100 and was gone by late February.

Promotion
In December 2007, to help promote Right Now and the single "When You Believe", Jackson performed on various UK television shows such GMTV, This Morning and The X Factor.

After one year recording Right Now, Jackson debuted his new material. His first performance of this was on The X Factor, in which he sang "Don't Call This Love". Jackson also later appeared on the first show of the fifth series as the Celebrity Guest. The song was also performed on GMTV along with another track from the album, "You Don't Know Me". "Don't Call this Love" entered the United Kingdom chart at No.3, behind Pink's "So What" and Peter Kay's "The Winners Song". In Ireland, the song debuted at No.8.

Jackson performed the album's third single, "Creative", on the 2008 televised Children in Need, broadcast in November. The single entered the chart at No. 94 in the United Kingdom.

The album's fourth single, "Stargazing", failed to chart in the United Kingdom. The failure of this single was attributed to low promotion. Jackson was dropped by his record label in March 2009.

Singles

"When You Believe" was released as the winner's single in December 2007. Like many X Factor winner singles, it entered the United Kingdom chart at #1, staying there for 3 weeks, and #1 in Ireland. The song was gone from the charts by early February 2008. The single sold 490,000 copies. The single was available to download from midnight after the result of the show on 15 December 2007, and a CD was rush-released mid-week, on 19 December 2007. This is unusual as most new singles are released on a Monday to gain maximum sales for the UK Singles Chart the following Sunday. Exceptions included the previous two X Factor winners whose singles were released in this fashion, in order for them to compete to be the Christmas number-one single, which they all became. A video for the single was made by each of the final four of the series: Jackson, Rhydian Roberts, Same Difference and Niki Evans. However, only the winner's version of the song and video was released.

The song ended 2007 as the year's fourth biggest-selling single in the UK and remained number one into 2008. However, this version of the song only managed to stay in the top 40 for seven weeks, despite being at the top of the chart for three weeks. It soon disappeared from the top 100, and was gone by late February.

"Don't Call This Love" was released in October 2008 as the second single from Right Now. In the United Kingdom, "Don't Call this Love" debuted inside the top five on the UK Singles Charts, charting at number three week beginning 25 November 2008, following several promotional appearances, including a "winner's comeback" performance on The X Factor. The following week, "Don't Call this Love" fell to number eleven on the UK charts, slipping out of the top ten entirely. It remained in the UK Top 40 for a following week, charting at number twenty, before slipping from the Top 40 to number forty-two, week commencing 15 November 2008. The following week, 22 November, "Don't Call this Love" charted at number seventy-nine before falling out of the UK Top 100 Singles Charts.

In Jackson's native Scotland, "Don't Call this Love" was considerably more successful. The single topped the Scottish Singles Charts and remained at the number one position for two weeks, before slipping to number five on the charts and being knocked off the top spot by the X Factor's cover version of Mariah Carey's "Hero". In its following week, the song managed to remain within the Scottish Top 10 Singles, slipping to number eight and then to number ten the following week. On the chart update for the week commencing 23 November, "Don't Call this Love" had slipped from the Scottish Top 10 to its new position of number thirteen, falling three places from number ten the previous week, with a new entry from Duffy with "Rain On Your Parade" knocking the song down to number thirteen. "Don't Call this Love" continued to fall down the charts in Scotland until its eighth week in the chart, where an increase in sales meant "Don't Call this Love" climbed from number twenty to number seventeen. "Don't Call this Love" remained within the Scottish Top 100 Singles Charts for forty-one weeks, where its last charting position was number thirty.

In Ireland, "Don't Call This Love" debuted at number eight on the Irish Singles Charts, where it remained within the top 100 for a further five weeks. The song also debuted at number ten on the European Hot 100 Singles charts. On 10 January 2009 "Don't Call this Love" re-entered the UK Singles Charts at number ninety-three.

"Creative" was released in November 2008 as the album's third single. To promote the track Jackson appeared on the BBC Children in Need 2008 show performing the song as an "exclusive" as this was the first time Jackson had performed it. The song entered the UK Singles Charts at #94.

"Stargazing" was released in February 2009 but did not reach the United Kingdom official chart. Yet again the song was only available via digital download. Jackson did not appear on any TV show to promote the single, nor was any music video created for the song. After "Stargazing" failed to chart, Jackson was dropped from the label. The BBC commented on "Stargazing", "While the lyrics for 'Stargazing' may be rather saccharine—rhyming 'star gazing' with 'amazing' is a bit too much to take—the pace and structure (along with all-important key change) makes it pretty special—which can be said about all the tracks here.

Critical reception

Right Now received mixed reviews. Digital Spy rated the album two out of five, saying "Jackson doesn't do a bad job, wrapping his warm, smooth vocals around a succession of beige ballads, classics that are too old for him (Leon Russell's 'A Song For You', Dorothy Moore's 'Misty Blue', Ray Charles's 'You Don't Know Me') and the odd uptempo big band number. But other than sounding surprisingly manly for a slight 19-year-old and singing in a Scottish accent for the first time on the album's penultimate track, he doesn't make much of an impression. He's rarely asked to test his range and there are few glimmers of personality across Right Now's 50 minutes."

Chart performance
In Jackson's native Scotland, Right Now debuted on the Scottish Singles and Albums Charts at number two. The following week, Right Now slipped from number two to number five, followed by number eleven and twenty in week three and four respectively. In week five, an increase in sales saw Right Now climb two places, from number twenty to number eighteen in Scotland. Right Now would slip to number 21 in the following week and then to number 28 in its seventh week inside the charts. In its eighth week of release, Right Now managed to remain just inside the Scottish Top 40, charting at number 40 and then on 21 December it fell from the Scottish Top 40 entirely, sitting at number 46. Right Now went on to spend a total of twelve weeks inside the Scottish Top 100 Albums.

In the United Kingdom, Right Now debuted at number four on the week commencing 1 November 2008. The following week, the album fell from the UK Top 10 Albums where it charted at number twenty. It would spend a further week within the UK Top 40, charting at number 37 on 15 October before falling from the Top 40 entirely, falling to number 44 the following week (22 October). In the chart update for 29 October Right Now climbed two places up the chart, from number 44 to number 42. Right Now last charted at number 90 on the UK Albums Chart, and spent a total of ten weeks within the UK Top 100 Albums. Right Now received a Gold certification from the BPI in January 2009. It has sold 136,117 copies as of November 2015.

Track listing

Charts

Weekly charts

Year-end charts
 United Kingdom: #75

Release history

References

2008 debut albums
Leon Jackson albums
Syco Music albums